Bledri (died 1022) was Bishop of Llandaff from the late 10th cent. until his death in 1022. He was succeeded by Bishop Joseph. His appointment is recorded in 'Liber Landavensis' (Book of Llandaff).

References 

11th-century Welsh bishops
1022 deaths
10th-century Welsh bishops